Mayura is a major Kannada monthly literary magazine, published in Karnataka, India, which has its headquarters in Mysuru, Karnataka. It is also published from Davangere, Gulbarga, Mangaluru, Hubli, Mumbai, New Delhi, Kolkata, Chennai and Hyderabad.

The magazine includes novels, stories (detective, scientific and secular), short stories, children stories, comedy write ups, film reviews, celebrity interviews, serials/soaps and more. Stories translated from Telugu, Tamil, Malayalam, Hindi, Marathi, English and other languages are often published.

History 
Mayura was started in 1968 by The Printers, Mysore (estd. 1948).

Past writers of the magazine include P. Lankesh, K. P. Poornachandra Tejaswi, Goruru Ramaswamy Iyengar, Anupama Niranjana, M. K. Indira, Jayanth Kaikini, Besagarahalli Ramanna, T. K. Rama Rao, Fakir Mohammad Katpadi, Bolwar Mahammad Kunhi, Veerabhadrappa, Baraguru Ramachandrappa, Beechi, Nagathihalli Chandrashekhar, M.H. Nayak Baada, Na D'Souza, Gopalakrishna Pai

Sister publications
 Deccan Herald, an English daily newspaper
 Sudha, Kannada weekly magazine
 Prajavani, Kannada daily newspaper

See also
 List of Kannada-language magazines
 Tushara, a Kannada monthly literary magazine

References

External links

1968 establishments in Mysore State
Monthly magazines published in India
Kannada-language magazines
Magazines established in 1968
Mass media in Bangalore
Literary magazines published in India